The American-180 is a submachine gun developed in the 1960s which fires .22 LR cartridges from a pan magazine.  The concept began with the Casull Model 290 that used a flat pan magazine similar to designs widely used prior to World War II.  Only 80 Casull M290s were built as the weapon was expensive to produce.  The American-180 is an improved version.  A semi-automatic only variant called the American SAR 180/275 is still produced on a custom basis by E&L Manufacturing of Riddle, Oregon.

Operation
The weapon operates through a conventional blowback mechanism.  It uses an open bolt with a flat pan magazine. It fires at a very high rate of fire of approximately 1,200 RPM. The American-180 was purchased mostly by private parties prior to the American ban on production of machine guns for the US civilian market.  The A180 was adopted by the Utah Department of Corrections to arm correctional officers.

Despite the low power of the .22 LR round, testing demonstrated that automatic fire could penetrate even concrete and bulletproof vests from cumulative damage. However, the target would have to remain still for some amount of time to allow the cumulative damage to amass in the same area to achieve this.

Users
 :  Rhodesian SAS.
 : 4th Reconnaissance Regiment
 :  Various law enforcement agencies and correctional facilities.
 : 2 were used respectively by the GIPN of Marseille and the Research and Intervention Brigade of Paris in the 1980s.

See also
MGV-176

References

External links
 User Manual
 American-180 submachine gun at Modern Firearms
 —History and shooting

.22 LR submachine guns
Submachine guns of the United States